Victory Day is an album by the Canadian rock band, Tom Cochrane & Red Rider, which was released in September 1988. Victory Day sold more than 200,000 copies in Canada and became Cochrane's first double platinum album with Red Rider. The album garnered Cochrane and Red Rider three Juno Award nominations. Victory Day was the third best-selling Cancon album in Canada of 1989.

Track listing

Personnel
 Tom Cochrane - vocals, guitars
 Ken Greer - guitars
 John Webster - keyboards
 Ken "Spider" Sinnaeve - bass
 Randall Coryell - drums

References

Red Rider albums
1988 albums
Albums produced by Don Gehman
Capitol Records albums